Altavilla Monferrato is a comune (municipality) in the Province of Alessandria in the Italian region Piedmont, located about  east of Turin and about  northwest of Alessandria.

Altavilla Monferrato borders the following municipalities: Casorzo, Felizzano, Fubine, Montemagno, Viarigi, and Vignale Monferrato.
The economy is mostly based on agriculture.

References

Cities and towns in Piedmont